Bruce Robert Allpress (25 August 1930 – 23 April 2020) was a New Zealand actor.

Biography
Allpress grew up in Dunedin, the second son of William and Gladys Allpress. He began performing in the 1960s in a vaudeville minstrel show called the Cheeseman Singer Series. He began working in television drama with a role in the series Hunter's Gold, then spent several years as a regular character on the late 1970s soap opera Close to Home.

He appeared in many television dramas and also presented on television and radio productions. In the mid-1980s, he was a regular on The Billy T. James Show, as well as featuring alongside Tommy Lee Jones in the pirate adventure film Nate and Hayes. His most known role is Aldor, archer of Rohan that accidentally shot the first Uruk-hai from their army in the film The Lord of the Rings: The Two Towers.

Allpress died on 23 April 2020, aged 89, six months after being diagnosed with amyotrophic lateral sclerosis.

Awards
In 1981 and 1983, Allpress was awarded the Feltex Television Award for Best Actor in the series Jocko''.

Filmography

References

External links

1930 births
2020 deaths
New Zealand male television actors
Deaths from motor neuron disease
Neurological disease deaths in New Zealand